This is a complete list of crossings of the Spokane River from its mouth at the Columbia River to its source at Lake Coeur d'Alene. It includes bridges and other crossings.

Crossings
All locations are in Washington unless otherwise specified.

Diversion channel 
All locations are in Spokane's Riverfront Park.  This corresponds to the area between the Monroe Street Bridge and Division Street Bridge above.

References

Spokane River
Spokane